While Satan Sleeps is a 1922 American silent Western film directed by Joseph Henabery and written by Albert S. Le Vino based upon a story by Peter B. Kyne. It stars Jack Holt, Wade Boteler, Mabel Van Buren, Fritzi Brunette, Will Walling and J. P. Lockney. The film was released by Paramount Pictures on June 22, 1922. It is now considered lost.

Cast 
 Jack Holt as Phil
 Wade Boteler as Red Barton
 Mabel Van Buren as Sunflower Sadie
 Fritzi Brunette as Salome Deming
 Will Walling as Bud Deming
 J. P. Lockney as Chuckkawalla Bill
 Fred Huntley as Absolom Randall
 Bobbie Mack as Bones
 Sylvia Ashton as Mrs. Bones
 Herbert Standing as Bishop

References

External links

 
 

1922 films
1922 Western (genre) films
Paramount Pictures films
Films directed by Joseph Henabery
American black-and-white films
Silent American Western (genre) films
1920s English-language films
1920s American films